Ozernaya is a river in the Krasnoyarsk Krai of Russia on the island of October Revolution, belonging to Severnaya Zemlya archipelago. The river originates in the Fiordovoye lake, for the most part flows in a south-westerly direction and meet the Kara sea with the formation of a delta. In the middle reaches, it goes around the Vavilov ice dome along its southeastern border, where several tributaries from the glacier flow into the river.

There are no permanent settlements along the river.

References

Rivers of Krasnoyarsk Krai
Drainage basins of the Kara Sea